The Karun-3 dam is a hydroelectric dam on the Karun river located in the province of Khuzestan, Iran. It was built to help meet Iran's energy demands as well as to provide seasonal flood control. The Karun river has the highest discharge slits and seasonal flooding in Iran.

The Karun-3 power generators are connected to the national power grid. The dam has one of the largest generator capacities in Iran which help the electric power shortage during the peak usage in the summer time.

This dam is of concrete double arch type.

The arch dam design is ideal for this location which has a narrow, rocky gorge behind the water reservoir. Moreover, because of its arch shape, the force of the reservoir water presses downward against the dam which strengthens the dam foundation.

See also 

 Dez Dam

References

External links 
 

Hydroelectric power stations in Iran
Reservoirs in Iran
Buildings and structures in Khuzestan Province
Dams in Khuzestan Province
Dams completed in 2005
Arch dams
Dams on the Karun River
2005 establishments in Iran